Wu Dan (born 13 January 1968) is a Chinese former volleyball player who competed in the 1988 Summer Olympics, in the 1992 Summer Olympics, and in the 2000 Summer Olympics. She tested positive for the banned substance strychnine at the 1992 Olympics; she had taken traditional Chinese medicine containing the substance.

References

1968 births
Living people
Chinese women's volleyball players
Olympic volleyball players of China
Volleyball players at the 1988 Summer Olympics
Volleyball players at the 1992 Summer Olympics
Volleyball players at the 2000 Summer Olympics
Olympic bronze medalists for China
Olympic medalists in volleyball
Doping cases in volleyball
Asian Games medalists in volleyball
Volleyball players at the 1986 Asian Games
Volleyball players at the 1990 Asian Games
Medalists at the 1988 Summer Olympics
Medalists at the 1986 Asian Games
Medalists at the 1990 Asian Games
Asian Games gold medalists for China
20th-century Chinese women